Ronnie Barron (born Ronald Raymond Barrosse, October 9, 1943, in Algiers, New Orleans – March 20, 1997) was an American actor, keyboardist, organist, and blue-eyed soul singer during the 1970s. He was known for his work as a session musician, and a sideman for several artists, as well as his collaborations with Dr. John, a fellow New Orleans native.

Musicians who employed him include Paul Butterfield, Canned Heat, Ry Cooder, Tom Waits, Eric Burdon & the Animals, Delaney & Bonnie and Friends, and others.

Barron met Mac Rebennack in 1958 and performed with him at several venues around New Orleans. They were classmates at Jesuit High School in New Orleans.  During that period, he created the Reverend Ether persona to satisfy audiences who were primarily interested in entertainers. Rebennack was so impressed with the gimmick that he wanted Barron to become Dr. John. Barron was hired by Sonny and Cher in 1965, and relocated to California to become a session musician, and left the Reverend Ether character behind.

He was married to Linda Kelly and had two children, Ronald Raymond, Jr. and Ava. He died in 1997 from complications of heart problems.

Filmography

References

External links 

1943 births
1997 deaths
Rhythm and blues musicians from New Orleans
American rock keyboardists
Canned Heat members
20th-century American singers
American session musicians
Singers from Louisiana
20th-century American keyboardists